The 2020–21 season was the 26th season of competitive association football in Slovakia after Czechoslovakia was divided into two new states.

Slovakia national football team

UEFA Nations League

UEFA Euro 2020 qualifying play-offs

The winner of Path B, Slovakia, entered Group E in the final tournament.

Bracket

Semi-final

Final

2022 FIFA World Cup qualification

UEFA Euro 2020

International Friendly

Slovakia women's national football team

2020 Cyprus Women's Cup

UEFA Women's Euro 2022 qualifying

International Friendly

UEFA club's competitions

UEFA Champions League

First qualifying round

|}

UEFA Europa League

First qualifying round

|}

Second qualifying round

|}

Third qualifying round

|}

UEFA Youth League

The 2019–20 Slovak U19 League was abandoned due to the COVID-19 pandemic in Slovakia. The top team of the league at the time of the abandonment, Žilina, were selected to play in the 2020–21 UEFA Youth League by the Slovak Football Association in the Domestic Champions Path. The UEFA Executive Committee has decided to cancel the 2020–21 UEFA Youth League due to the COVID-19 pandemic and its effects on the staging of competitions.

UEFA Women's Champions League

Knockout phase

Men's football

Notes

Fortuna liga

2. liga

3. liga

Slovak Cup

Czechoslovak Supercup 

The 2020 Supercup was canceled due to the COVID-19 outbreak.

Women's football

Slovak Women's First League

The season was abandoned due COVID-19 pandemic in Slovakia.

2. liga žien

Slovak Women's Cup 
The competition was abandoned due COVID-19 pandemic in Slovakia.

First round 

|}

Bracket

Managerial changes 
This is a list of changes of managers within Slovakia league football:

New clubs

Clubs removed

Deaths
 Jozef Vengloš

Retirements

See also 
2020–21 Slovak Cup
2020–21 2. Liga (Slovakia)
List of Slovak football transfers summer 2020
List of Slovak football transfers winter 2020–21
List of foreign Slovak First League players

Notes

References

External links 
 Slovak Football Association
 UEFA
 futbalnet.sk

 
National Team